The Imghad Tuareg Self-Defense Group and Allies (abbreviated GATIA) is an armed group in Azawad, Mali. Many of its 500 to 1,000 fighters are Imghad Tuaregs, and the group supports the Malian government and army.

History 
GATIA was founded on 14 August 2014 as a self-defense group of armed locals, in response to the Malian Army's defeat in the 2nd Battle of Kidal on 21 May 2014 by the National Movement for the Liberation of Azawad (MNLA).

In collaboration with French forces, GATIA and the Movement for the Salvation of Azawad (MSA) launched a joint-operation on 23 February 2018 to capture or kill Abu Walid al-Sahrawi, the ISIL commander in Mali. Sahrawi managed to evade capture, but six ISIL militants were killed in the clashes.

GATIA-MSA forces clashed with ISIL militants from 2 to 5 June 2018. ISIL commanders Almahmoud Ag Akawkaw was captured, while Amat Ag Assalate was killed during the battle.

Ideology 
GATIA is a pro-Malian government group, and is opposed to the MNLA and an independent Azawad.

References 

Azawad
Organizations established in 2014
Political movements in Mali
Rebel groups in Mali
2014 establishments in Mali